Cristian Podea (born February 22, 1979 in Bucharest) is a former Romanian rugby union player and coach. He played as a scrum-half.

Club career
During his career, Podea played for Universitatea Cluj, Dinamo București, CSU Arad, Timișoara, Baia Mare and again for Universitatea Cluj.

International career
Podea gathered 9 caps for Romania, from his debut in 2001 to his last game in 2003. He was a member of his national side for the 6th  Rugby World Cup in 2003 playing one match against host country, the Wallabies.

Since 2019, Podea is the current team manager of U Cluj Rugby, which plays in the Romanian SuperLiga.

References

External links

1979 births
Living people
Romanian rugby union players
Romanian rugby union coaches
Romania international rugby union players
Rugby union scrum-halves
CS Universitatea Cluj-Napoca (rugby union) players
SCM Rugby Timișoara players
CS Dinamo București (rugby union) players
CSM Știința Baia Mare players
Rugby union players from Bucharest